Ancyloxypha arene, the tropical least skipper, is a species of grass skipper in the butterfly family Hesperiidae. It is found in Central America and North America.

References

Further reading

External links

Ancyloxypha
Articles created by Qbugbot